Chions is a comune (municipality) in the Province of Pordenone in the Italian region Friuli-Venezia Giulia, located about  northwest of Trieste and about  southeast of Pordenone.

The municipality of Chions contains the frazioni (subdivisions, mainly villages and hamlets) Basedo, Taiedo, Villotta, and Torrate.

Chions borders the following municipalities: Azzano Decimo, Cinto Caomaggiore, Fiume Veneto, Pramaggiore, Pravisdomini, San Vito al Tagliamento, Sesto al Reghena.

Demographic evolution

Twin towns
Chions is twinned with:

  Luisant, France
  Villanueva del Pardillo, Spain

References

External links
 www.comune.chions.pn.it/

Cities and towns in Friuli-Venezia Giulia